Vischongo District is one of eight districts of the Vilcas Huamán Province in Peru.

Geography 
Other mountains are listed below:

Ethnic groups 
The people in the district are mainly indigenous citizens of Quechua descent (mostly Chanka). Quechua is the language which the majority of the population (83.00%) learnt to speak in childhood, 16.54% of the residents started speaking using the Spanish language (2007 Peru Census).

See also 
 Inti Watana
 Pumaqucha
 Titankayuq

References